Abello or Abelló is a Spanish and Italian toponymic surname, and it's named after Avella in Italy. The name is more common in Spain today. Notable people with the surname include:

Jorge Enrique Abello (born 1968), Colombian actor
José Abello Silva, Colombian drug trafficker
Juan Abelló (born 1941), Spanish businessman and art collector
Montserrat Abelló i Soler (1918-2014), Spanish poet and translator

See also
Abelló Museum, art museum in Catalonia, Spain